The Association of Architecture School Librarians (AASL) was founded in 1979. Its membership is open to any person or institution interested in the advancement of academic architectural librarianship and architecture education.

Mission

AASL was established to advance academic architectural librarianship, to develop and enhance the role of architecture school librarians in the advancement of architectural education, and to promote a spirit of cooperation among members of the profession.

History

AASL was established in January 1979 at the annual meeting of the Association of Collegiate Schools of Architecture.

Organizational structure

The officers of AASL consist of a president, vice-president/president-elect, secretary, treasurer, webmaster, column editors, and the immediate past president.
Past officers are listed on the association's website.

Annual conferences

AASL meets annually with the Association of Collegiate Schools of Architecture. Topics of conference sessions include collection development, user education, image retrieval, internet resources, special collections, electronic databases, the library's role in architecture school accreditation, and the acquisition of local architectural information.

The association introduced an open-access Conference Content Portal in 2016 that provides access to content produced for and/or sponsored by the AASL annual conference.

2019 - 41st annual, Pittsburgh, Pennsylvania
2018 - 40th annual, Denver, Colorado
2017 - 39th annual, Detroit, Michigan
2016 - 38th annual, Seattle, Washington
2015 - 37th annual, Toronto, Ontario
2014 - 36th annual, Miami, Florida
2013 - 35th annual, San Francisco, California
2012 - 34th annual, Boston, Massachusetts
2011 - 33rd annual, Montreal, Quebec
2010 - 32nd annual, New Orleans, Louisiana
2009 - 31st annual, Portland, Oregon
2008 - 30th annual, Houston, Texas
2007 - 29th annual, Philadelphia, Pennsylvania
2006 - 28th annual, Salt Lake City, Utah
2005 - 27th annual, Chicago, Illinois
2004 - 26th annual, Miami, Florida
2003 - 25th annual, Louisville, Kentucky
2002 - 24th annual, New Orleans, Louisiana
2001 - 23rd annual, Baltimore, Maryland
2000 - 22nd annual, Los Angeles, California
1999 - 21st annual,. Minneapolis, Minnesota
1998 - 20th annual, Cleveland, Ohio
1997 - 19th annual, Dallas, Texas
1996 - 18th annual, Boston, Massachusetts
1995 - 17th annual, Seattle, Washington
1994 - 16th annual, Montreal, Quebec
1993 - 15th annual, Charleston, South Carolina
1992 - 14th annual, Disney World, Florida
1991 - 13th annual, Washington, District of Columbia
1990 - 12th annual, San Francisco, California
1989 - 11th annual, Chicago, Illinois
1988 - 10th annual, Quebec City, Quebec
1987 - 9th annual, Los Angeles, California
1986 - 8th annual, Miami, Florida
1985 - 7th annual, Vancouver, British Columbia
1984 - 6th annual, Charleston, South Carolina
1983 - 5th annual, Santa Fe, New Mexico
1982 - 4th annual, Quebec City, Quebec
1981 - 3rd annual, Asilomar, California
1980 - 2nd annual, San Antonio, Texas
1979 - 1st annual, Savannah, Georgia

Awards and honors

AASL offers two travel awards to its annual conference and two service awards.

The travel awards are the Francis Chen Travel Award and the Student Travel Award, both established in 2007.

The service awards are the Distinguished Service Award (established in 2012) and the Professional Service Award (established in 2015).

Past recipients are listed on the association's website.

Affiliated organizations

 ARCHLIB
 Art Libraries Society of North America
 Association of Collegiate Schools of Architecture
 Society of Architectural Historians
 Visual Resources Association

See also
List of library associations

References

External links
 

Library associations